Pichekan (also Romanized as Pīchekān and Pīchegān; also known as Pīchehkān, Qal‘eh Pishkūh, and Qal‘eh-ye Pīshkūh) is a village in Zirkuh Rural District, Central District, Zirkuh County, South Khorasan Province, Iran. At the 2006 census, its population was 77, in 21 families.

References 

Populated places in Zirkuh County